The Texas Rangers 1996 season involved the Rangers finishing 1st in the American League west with a record of 90 wins and 72 losses.  It would be the first post-season appearance for the Senators/Rangers in franchise history, taking 36 seasons to finally accomplish the feat. This remains the longest amount of time it has ever taken any North American professional sports franchise to make their first playoff appearance.
The Rangers would win their first post-season game at Yankee Stadium against the New York Yankees, but would lose the last three games to lose the division series.  The one post-season win would be the club's only post-season success until 2010.

Offseason
 October 8, 1995: Scott Podsednik was sent by the Rangers to the Florida Marlins to complete an earlier deal (the Rangers sent players to be named later to the Marlins for Bobby Witt, and sent Wilson Heredia to the Marlins on August 11) and made on August 8, 1995.
 December 21, 1995: Ken Hill was signed as a free agent by the Rangers.
 December 22, 1995: Mike Henneman was signed as a free agent by the Rangers.
January 16, 1996: Kevin Elster was signed as a free agent with the Texas Rangers.

Regular season

Season standings

Record vs. opponents

Game log

|- bgcolor="ccffcc"
| 1 || April 1 || Red Sox || 5–3 || Hill (1–0) || Clemens || Vosberg (1) || 40,484 || 1–0
|- bgcolor="ccffcc"
| 2 || April 3 || Red Sox || 7–2 || Pavlik (1–0) || Gordon || — || 24,483 || 2–0
|- bgcolor="ccffcc"
| 3 || April 4 || Red Sox || 13–2 || Gross (1–0) || Wakefield || — || 18,086 || 3–0
|- bgcolor="ccffcc"
| 4 || April 6 || Yankees || 4–2 || Witt (1–0) || Key || Henneman (1) || 35,510 || 4–0
|- bgcolor="ccffcc"
| 5 || April 7 || Yankees || 7–2 || Hill (2–0) || Gooden || — || — || 5–0
|- bgcolor="ccffcc"
| 6 || April 7 || Yankees || 4–1 || Pavlik (2–0) || Howe || Vosberg (2) || 36,248 || 6–0
|- bgcolor="ccffcc"
| 7 || April 9 || @ White Sox || 3–2 || Gross (2–0) || Thomas || Henneman (2) || 34,750 || 7–0
|- bgcolor="ffbbbb"
| 8 || April 11 || @ White Sox || 5–8 (11) || Thomas || Henneman (0–1) || — || 16,685 || 7–1
|- bgcolor="ffbbbb"
| 9 || April 12 || @ Yankees || 3–4 || Cone || Hill (2–1) || Wetteland || 20,238 || 7–2
|- bgcolor="ccffcc"
| 10 || April 13 || @ Yankees || 10–6 || Pavlik (3–0) || Gooden || Vosberg (3) || 19,603 || 8–2
|- bgcolor="ffbbbb"
| 11 || April 14 || @ Yankees || 3–12 || Pettitte || Gross (2–1) || — || 20,181 || 8–3
|- bgcolor="ffbbbb"
| 12 || April 15 || Athletics || 3–8 || Mohler || Heredia (0–1) || — || 19,312 || 8–4
|- bgcolor="ccffcc"
| 13 || April 16 || Athletics || 5–3 || Witt (2–0) || Johns || Henneman (3) || 20,948 || 9–4
|- bgcolor="ccffcc"
| 14 || April 17 || Athletics || 12–1 || Hill (3–1) || Reyes || — || 24,120 || 10–4
|- bgcolor="ccffcc"
| 15 || April 19 || Orioles || 26–7 || Cook (1–0) || Mercker || Vosberg (4) || 41,184 || 11–4
|- bgcolor="ccffcc"
| 16 || April 20 || Orioles || 8–3 || Gross (3–1) || Haynes || — || 45,358 || 12–4
|- bgcolor="ccffcc"
| 17 || April 21 || Orioles || 9–6 || Oliver (1–0) || Wells || — || 39,456 || 13–4
|- bgcolor="ffbbbb"
| 18 || April 22 || White Sox || 4–12 || Fernandez || Witt (2–1) || Karchner || 22,348 || 13–5
|- bgcolor="ffbbbb"
| 19 || April 23 || White Sox || 5–6 || Baldwin || Hill (3–2) || Hernandez || 29,123 || 13–6
|- bgcolor="ffbbbb"
| 20 || April 24 || @ Red Sox || 9–11 || Stanton || Heredia (0–2) || Slocumb || 19,217 || 13–7
|- bgcolor="ffbbbb"
| 21 || April 25 || @ Red Sox || 3–8 || Wakefield || Gross (3–2) || — || 20,350 || 13–8
|- bgcolor="ccffcc"
| 22 || April 26 || @ Orioles || 5–4 || Brandenburg (1–0) || Wells || Henneman (4) || 44,022 || 14–8
|- bgcolor="ccffcc"
| 23 || April 27 || @ Orioles || 4–2 || Witt (3–1) || Erickson || Vosberg (5) || 47,311 || 15–8
|- bgcolor="ccffcc"
| 24 || April 28 || @ Orioles || 5–4 (10) || Heredia (1–2) || McDowell || Henneman (5) || 47,327 || 16–8
|- bgcolor="ffbbbb"
| 25 || April 29 || @ Orioles || 7–8 || Haynes || Helling (0–1) || Myers || 41,503 || 16–9
|- bgcolor="ffbbbb"
| 26 || April 30 || Mariners || 0–8 || Bosio || Gross (3–3) || — || 27,272 || 16–10
|-

|- bgcolor="ccffcc"
| 27 || May 1 || Mariners || 5–4 || Russell (1–0) || Jackson || Henneman (6) || 31,775 || 17–10
|- bgcolor="ffbbbb"
| 28 || May 2 || @ Tigers || 2–5 || Lira || Witt (3–2) || Williams || 7,416 || 17–11
|- bgcolor="ccffcc"
| 29 || May 3 || @ Tigers || 11–0 || Hill (4–2) || Keagle || — || 9,079 || 18–11
|- bgcolor="ccffcc"
| 30 || May 4 || @ Tigers || 3–1 || Pavlik (4–0) || Gohr || — || 10,734 || 19–11
|- bgcolor="ccffcc"
| 31 || May 5 || @ Tigers || 3–2 || Gross (4–3) || Lima || Henneman (7) || 12,337 || 20–11
|- bgcolor="ccffcc"
| 32 || May 7 || Blue Jays || 5–1 || Oliver (2–0) || Guzman || — || 23,005 || 21–11
|- bgcolor="ccffcc"
| 33 || May 8 || Blue Jays || 4–2 || Witt (4–2) || Hanson || Henneman (8) || 20,694 || 22–11
|- bgcolor="ffbbbb"
| 34 || May 9 || Blue Jays || 2–5 || Quantrill || Hill (4–3) || Timlin || 34,451 || 22–12
|- bgcolor="ccffcc"
| 35 || May 10 || Tigers || 6–2 || Pavlik (5–0) || Lima || Henneman (9) || 31,426 || 23–12
|- bgcolor="ccffcc"
| 36 || May 11 || Tigers || 11–7 || Gross (5–3) || Aldred || — || 42,732 || 24–12
|- bgcolor="ffbbbb"
| 37 || May 12 || Tigers || 3–5 || Lira || Oliver (2–1) || Myers || 35,677 || 24–13
|- bgcolor="ccffcc"
| 38 || May 13 || Royals || 7–6 || Cook (2–0) || Montgomery || Henneman (10) || 22,981 || 25–13
|- bgcolor="ccffcc"
| 39 || May 14 || Royals || 10–0 || Hill (5–3) || Gubicza || — || 28,999 || 26–13
|- bgcolor="ffbbbb"
| 40 || May 15 || Royals || 1–3 || Haney || Pavlik (5–1) || Montgomery || 26,881 || 26–14
|- bgcolor="ffbbbb"
| 41 || May 17 || @ Indians || 10–12 || Embree || Heredia (1–3) || Mesa || 41,225 || 26–15
|- bgcolor="ccffcc"
| 42 || May 18 || @ Indians || 6–3 || Oliver (3–1) || Anderson || Henneman (11) || 40,973 || 27–15
|- bgcolor="ffbbbb"
| 43 || May 19 || @ Indians || 5–8 || Nagy || Witt (4–3) || Mesa || 43,299 || 27–16
|- bgcolor="ffbbbb"
| 44 || May 21 || @ Twins || 3–4 || Milchin || Henneman (0–2) || — || 12,323 || 27–17
|- bgcolor="ccffcc"
| 45 || May 22 || @ Twins || 6–5 || Pavlik (6–1) || Parra || Henneman (12) || 17,955 || 28–17
|- bgcolor="ffbbbb"
| 46 || May 23 || @ Royals || 2–4 || Appier || Oliver (3–2) || Montgomery || 15,612 || 28–18
|- bgcolor="ffbbbb"
| 47 || May 24 || @ Royals || 0–8 || Gubicza || Witt (4–4) || — || 13,696 || 28–19
|- bgcolor="ccffcc"
| 48 || May 25 || @ Royals || 2–1 || Helling (1–1) || Haney || Henneman (13) || 23,668 || 29–19
|- bgcolor="ccffcc"
| 49 || May 26 || @ Royals || 6–4 || Hill (6–3) || Linton || Henneman (14) || 22,665 || 30–19
|- bgcolor="ccffcc"
| 50 || May 27 || Indians || 3–2 || Pavlik (7–1) || McDowell || — || 46,521 || 31–19
|- bgcolor="ccffcc"
| 51 || May 28 || Indians || 11–3 || Oliver (4–2) || Hershiser || — || 35,727 || 32–19
|- bgcolor="ccffcc"
| 52 || May 29 || Indians || 5–4 || Cook (3–0) || Tavarez || Henneman (15) || 35,893 || 33–19
|- bgcolor="ccffcc"
| 53 || May 31 || Twins || 7–2 || Hill (7–3) || Rodriguez || — || 32,861 || 34–19
|-

|- bgcolor="ffbbbb"
| 54 || June 1 || Twins || 5–9 || Milchin || Henneman (0–3) || — || 43,413 || 34–20
|- bgcolor="ffbbbb"
| 55 || June 2 || Twins || 5–6 || Guardado || Russell (1–1) || — || 33,809 || 34–21
|- bgcolor="ccffcc"
| 56 || June 3 || @ Brewers || 9–6 || Witt (5–4) || Sparks || Henneman (16) || 9,748 || 35–21
|- bgcolor="ffbbbb"
| 57 || June 4 || @ Brewers || 2–6 || Bones || Gross (5–4) || — || 10,685 || 35–22
|- bgcolor="ffbbbb"
| 58 || June 5 || @ Brewers || 4–6 || McDonald || Hill (7–4) || Fetters || 11,276 || 35–23
|- bgcolor="ccffcc"
| 59 || June 7 || Blue Jays || 10–7 || Pavlik (8–1) || Janzen || Henneman (17) || 40,046 || 36–23
|- bgcolor="ccffcc"
| 60 || June 8 || Blue Jays || 2–0 || Oliver (5–2) || Guzman || — || 43,439 || 37–23
|- bgcolor="ccffcc"
| 61 || June 9 || Blue Jays || 8–6 || Witt (6–4) || Hanson || Henneman (18) || 41,605 || 38–23
|- bgcolor="ccffcc"
| 62 || June 10 || Brewers || 8–3 || Gross (6–4) || Givens || — || 43,275 || 39–23
|- bgcolor="ffbbbb"
| 63 || June 11 || Brewers || 4–14 || McDonald || Hill (7–5) || Garcia || 33,519 || 39–24
|- bgcolor="ccffcc"
| 64 || June 12 || Brewers || 13–6 || Pavlik (9–1) || Miranda || — || 34,842 || 40–24
|- bgcolor="ffbbbb"
| 65 || June 13 || @ Red Sox || 7–8 (10) || Slocumb || Henneman (0–4) || — || 32,645 || 40–25
|- bgcolor="ffbbbb"
| 66 || June 14 || @ Red Sox || 3–4 || Stanton || Witt (6–5) || — || 29,689 || 40–26
|- bgcolor="ccffcc"
| 67 || June 15 || @ Red Sox || 13–3 || Gross (7–4) || Wakefield || — || 33,186 || 41–26
|- bgcolor="ffbbbb"
| 68 || June 16 || @ Red Sox || 9–10 || Hudson || Henneman (0–5) || — || 30,461 || 41–27
|- bgcolor="ffffff"
| 69 || June 17 || @ Orioles || 1–1 (6) ||  ||  || — || 45,581 || 41–27
|- bgcolor="ccffcc"
| 70 || June 18 || @ Orioles || 7–0 || Oliver (6–2) || Mercker || — || 47,318 || 42–27
|- bgcolor="ccffcc"
| 71 || June 19 || @ Orioles || 3–2 || Witt (7–5) || Mussina || Russell (1) || 45,581 || 43–27
|- bgcolor="ffbbbb"
| 72 || June 20 || @ Orioles || 2–3 || Wells || Gross (7–5) || Myers || 21,748 || 43–28
|- bgcolor="ccffcc"
| 73 || June 21 || Red Sox || 14–4 || Hill (8–5) || Minchey || — || 40,726 || 44–28
|- bgcolor="ccffcc"
| 74 || June 22 || Red Sox || 8–2 || Pavlik (10–1) || Wakefield || — || 46,444 || 45–28
|- bgcolor="ffbbbb"
| 75 || June 23 || Red Sox || 4–6 || Stanton || Cook (3–1) || Slocumb || 39,399 || 45–29
|- bgcolor="ffbbbb"
| 76 || June 24 || Orioles || 3–8 || Mussina || Witt (7–6) || — || 39,701 || 45–30
|- bgcolor="ccffcc"
| 77 || June 25 || Orioles || 5–2 || Gross (8–5) || Wells || Henneman (19) || 41,685 || 46–30
|- bgcolor="ccffcc"
| 78 || June 26 || Orioles || 6–5 || Cook (4–1) || Orosco || Henneman (20) || 38,984 || 47–30
|- bgcolor="ffbbbb"
| 79 || June 28 || @ Mariners || 8–19 || Carmona || Pavlik (10–2) || — || 34,413 || 47–31
|- bgcolor="ccffcc"
| 80 || June 29 || @ Mariners || 9–5 || Oliver (7–2) || Meacham || — || 37,556 || 48–31
|- bgcolor="ffbbbb"
| 81 || June 30 || @ Mariners || 3–4 || Hitchcock || Witt (7–7) || Charlton || 33,392 || 48–32
|-

|- bgcolor="ccffcc"
| 82 || July 1 || @ Angels || 8–6 || Gross (9–5) || Langston || Henneman (21) || 19,754 || 49–32
|- bgcolor="ffbbbb"
| 83 || July 2 || @ Angels || 5–6 || James || Henneman (0–6) || — || 19,055 || 49–33
|- bgcolor="ccffcc"
| 84 || July 3 || @ Angels || 8–1 || Pavlik (11–2) || Finley || — || 45,979 || 50–33
|- bgcolor="ffbbbb"
| 85 || July 4 || Mariners || 5–9 || Carmona || Henneman (0–7) || — || 46,668 || 50–34
|- bgcolor="ffbbbb"
| 86 || July 5 || Mariners || 3–6 || Hitchcock || Witt (7–8) || — || 46,397 || 50–35
|- bgcolor="ffbbbb"
| 87 || July 6 || Mariners || 5–9 || Wagner || Gross (9–6) || — || 46,458 || 50–36
|- bgcolor="ccffcc"
| 88 || July 7 || Mariners || 8–3 || Hill (9–5) || Wells || — || 36,933 || 51–36
|- bgcolor="ffbbbb"
| 89 || July 11 || @ Athletics || 3–8 || Chouinard || Oliver (7–3) || — || 13,437 || 51–37
|- bgcolor="ccffcc"
| 90 || July 12 || @ Athletics || 8–4 (10) || Russell (2–1) || Taylor || — || 12,074 || 52–37
|- bgcolor="ccffcc"
| 91 || July 13 || @ Athletics || 8–1 || Pavlik (12–2) || Wengert || — || 16,792 || 53–37
|- bgcolor="ffbbbb"
| 92 || July 14 || @ Athletics || 1–9 || Johns || Gross (9–7) || — || 20,704 || 53–38
|- bgcolor="ffbbbb"
| 93 || July 15 || Angels || 7–10 || Schmidt || Brandenburg (1–1) || Percival || 45,655 || 53–39
|- bgcolor="ccffcc"
| 94 || July 16 || Angels || 6–2 || Oliver (8–3) || Abbott || Russell (2) || 34,680 || 54–39
|- bgcolor="ccffcc"
| 95 || July 17 || Angels || 7–3 || Hill (10–5) || Finley || — || 44,220 || 55–39
|- bgcolor="ffbbbb"
| 96 || July 18 || Athletics || 4–5 (11) || Reyes || Brandenburg (1–2) || Van Poppel || 28,585 || 55–40
|- bgcolor="ffbbbb"
| 97 || July 19 || Athletics || 6–9 || Reyes || Helling (1–2) || Taylor || 37,455 || 55–41
|- bgcolor="ccffcc"
| 98 || July 20 || Athletics || 8–4 || Witt (8–8) || Van Poppel || — || 46,052 || 56–41
|- bgcolor="ffbbbb"
| 99 || July 21 || Athletics || 8–11 || Groom || Brandenburg (1–3) || Mohler || 36,039 || 56–42
|- bgcolor="ccffcc"
| 100 || July 22 || @ Yankees || 6–1 || Hill (11–5) || Rogers || — || 30,767 || 57–42
|- bgcolor="ffbbbb"
| 101 || July 23 || @ Yankees || 0–6 || Gooden || Pavlik (12–3) || — || 22,814 || 57–43
|- bgcolor="ffbbbb"
| 102 || July 24 || @ Yankees || 2–4 || Pettitte || Alberro (0–1) || Wetteland || 35,308 || 57–44
|- bgcolor="ccffcc"
| 103 || July 25 || @ White Sox || 4–3 (12) || Russell (3–1) || Keyser || Henneman (22) || 19,524 || 58–44
|- bgcolor="ffbbbb"
| 104 || July 26 || @ White Sox || 2–6 || Alvarez || Oliver (8–4) || — || 21,398 || 58–45
|- bgcolor="ccffcc"
| 105 || July 27 || @ White Sox || 6–4 (10) || Heredia (2–3) || Simas || Vosberg (6) || 22,629 || 59–45
|- bgcolor="ffbbbb"
| 106 || July 28 || @ White Sox || 1–5 || Fernandez || Pavlik (12–4) || — || 20,902 || 59–46
|- bgcolor="ccffcc"
| 107 || July 30 || Yankees || 15–2 || Witt (9–8) || Pettitte || — || 39,637 || 60–46
|- bgcolor="ccffcc"
| 108 || July 31 || Yankees || 9–2 || Oliver (9–4) || Key || — || 30,645 || 61–46
|-

|- bgcolor="ffbbbb"
| 109 || August 1 || Yankees || 5–6 || Rogers || Hill (11–6) || Wetteland || 34,855 || 61–47
|- bgcolor="ffbbbb"
| 110 || August 2 || White Sox || 0–9 || Fernandez || Pavlik (12–5) || — || 36,299 || 61–48
|- bgcolor="ffbbbb"
| 111 || August 3 || White Sox || 9–11 || Hernandez || Russell (3–2) || — || 46,481 || 61–49
|- bgcolor="ccffcc"
| 112 || August 4 || White Sox || 9–5 || Witt (10–8) || Baldwin || — || 32,854 || 62–49
|- bgcolor="ffbbbb"
| 113 || August 5 || White Sox || 5–15 || Alvarez || Oliver (9–5) || — || 29,973 || 62–50
|- bgcolor="ccffcc"
| 114 || August 6 || @ Tigers || 4–2 || Hill (12–6) || Lira || Henneman (23) || 10,931 || 63–50
|- bgcolor="ffbbbb"
| 115 || August 7 || @ Tigers || 2–4 || Cummings || Pavlik (12–6) || Myers || 10,297 || 63–51
|- bgcolor="ffbbbb"
| 116 || August 8 || @ Tigers || 2–3 || Olivares || Heredia (2–4) || — || 10,995 || 63–52
|- bgcolor="ccffcc"
| 117 || August 9 || @ Blue Jays || 5–4 || Witt (11–8) || Quantrill || Henneman (24) || 33,535 || 64–52
|- bgcolor="ccffcc"
| 118 || August 10 || @ Blue Jays || 12–1 || Oliver (10–5) || Guzman || — || 34,109 || 65–52
|- bgcolor="ccffcc"
| 119 || August 11 || @ Blue Jays || 6–0 || Burkett (1–0) || Hanson || — || 32,162 || 66–52
|- bgcolor="ccffcc"
| 120 || August 12 || Tigers || 7–0 || Hill (13–6) || Williams || — || 25,210 || 67–52
|- bgcolor="ccffcc"
| 121 || August 13 || Tigers || 6–2 || Pavlik (13–6) || Olivares || — || 31,331 || 68–52
|- bgcolor="ccffcc"
| 122 || August 14 || Tigers || 5–4 || Witt (12–8) || Van Poppel || Henneman (25) || 33,942 || 69–52
|- bgcolor="ccffcc"
| 123 || August 16 || Royals || 5–3 || Burkett (2–0) || Haney || Henneman (26) || 32,053 || 70–52
|- bgcolor="ffbbbb"
| 124 || August 17 || Royals || 1–4 || Belcher || Hill (13–7) || — || 41,855 || 70–53
|- bgcolor="ccffcc"
| 125 || August 18 || Royals || 10–3 || Gross (10–7) || Appier || — || 30,480 || 71–53
|- bgcolor="ccffcc"
| 126 || August 19 || @ Indians || 10–3 || Pavlik (14–6) || McDowell || — || 42,393 || 72–53
|- bgcolor="ffbbbb"
| 127 || August 20 || @ Indians || 4–10 || Lopez || Witt (12–9) || — || 42,370 || 72–54
|- bgcolor="ccffcc"
| 128 || August 21 || @ Indians || 10–8 (10) || Vosberg (1–0) || Tavarez || — || 42,345 || 73–54
|- bgcolor="ccffcc"
| 129 || August 22 || @ Twins || 11–2 || Hill (14–7) || Robertson || — || 17,342 || 74–54
|- bgcolor="ffbbbb"
| 130 || August 23 || @ Twins || 2–9 || Aguilera || Oliver (10–6) || — || 16,166 || 74–55
|- bgcolor="ffbbbb"
| 131 || August 24 || @ Twins || 5–6 || Rodriguez || Pavlik (14–7) || Trombley || 16,648 || 74–56
|- bgcolor="ccffcc"
| 132 || August 25 || @ Twins || 13–2 || Witt (13–9) || Miller || — || 14,818 || 75–56
|- bgcolor="ffbbbb"
| 133 || August 27 || @ Royals || 3–4 (10) || Montgomery || Russell (3–3) || — || 12,907 || 75–57
|- bgcolor="ffbbbb"
| 134 || August 28 || @ Royals || 3–4 (12) || Huisman || Gross (10–8) || — || 12,695 || 75–58
|- bgcolor="ccffcc"
| 135 || August 30 || Indians || 5–3 || Pavlik (15–7) || Ogea || Russell (3) || 40,383 || 76–58
|- bgcolor="ccffcc"
| 136 || August 31 || Indians || 6–3 || Oliver (11–6) || McDowell || Vosberg (7) || 46,319 || 77–58
|-

|- bgcolor="ffbbbb"
| 137 || September 1 || Indians || 2–8 || Nagy || Burkett (2–1) || — || 46,084 || 77–59
|- bgcolor="ffbbbb"
| 138 || September 2 || Twins || 4–6 || Aguilera || Hill (14–8) || Guardado || 24,786 || 77–60
|- bgcolor="ccffcc"
| 139 || September 3 || Twins || 9–7 || Witt (14–9) || Rodriguez || Henneman (27) || 28,401 || 78–60
|- bgcolor="ffbbbb"
| 140 || September 4 || Twins || 6–7 || Robertson || Heredia (2–5) || Trombley || 29,744 || 78–61
|- bgcolor="ccffcc"
| 141 || September 6 || @ Brewers || 7–3 || Burkett (3–1) || Eldred || — || 16,714 || 79–61
|- bgcolor="ccffcc"
| 142 || September 7 || @ Brewers || 2–1 || Hill (15–8) || McDonald || Henneman (28) || 19,110 || 80–61
|- bgcolor="ccffcc"
| 143 || September 8 || @ Brewers || 7–1 || Witt (15–9) || Florie || — || 17,542 || 81–61
|- bgcolor="ccffcc"
| 144 || September 9 || @ Blue Jays || 4–3 || Gross (11–8) || Hentgen || Henneman (29) || 25,825 || 82–61
|- bgcolor="ccffcc"
| 145 || September 10 || @ Blue Jays || 11–8 || Oliver (12–6) || Williams || Henneman (30) || 26,286 || 83–61
|- bgcolor="ffbbbb"
| 146 || September 11 || @ Blue Jays || 3–8 || Andujar || Vosberg (1–1) || — || 27,262 || 83–62
|- bgcolor="ffbbbb"
| 147 || September 12 || Brewers || 4–15 || McDonald || Hill (15–9) || — || 41,303 || 83–63
|- bgcolor="ffbbbb"
| 148 || September 13 || Brewers || 3–6 || D'Amico || Witt (15–10) || Fetters || 39,235 || 83–64
|- bgcolor="ffbbbb"
| 149 || September 14 || Brewers || 6–8 || Karl || Pavlik (15–8) || Fetters || 45,901 || 83–65
|- bgcolor="ccffcc"
| 150 || September 15 || Brewers || 6–2 || Oliver (13–6) || Garcia || Vosberg (8) || 45,941 || 84–65
|- bgcolor="ffbbbb"
| 151 || September 16 || @ Mariners || 0–6 || Moyer || Burkett (3–2) || — || 50,544 || 84–66
|- bgcolor="ffbbbb"
| 152 || September 17 || @ Mariners || 2–5 || Mulholland || Hill (15–10) || Ayala || 32,279 || 84–67
|- bgcolor="ffbbbb"
| 153 || September 18 || @ Mariners || 2–5 || Hitchcock || Witt (15–11) || Charlton || 35,162 || 84–68
|- bgcolor="ffbbbb"
| 154 || September 19 || @ Mariners || 6–7 || Davis || Cook (4–2) || Charlton || 39,769 || 84–69
|- bgcolor="ffbbbb"
| 155 || September 20 || @ Angels || 5–6 (10) || McElroy || Stanton (0–1) || — || 18,860 || 84–70
|- bgcolor="ccffcc"
| 156 || September 21 || @ Angels || 7–1 || Burkett (4–2) || Abbott || — || 24,104 || 85–70
|- bgcolor="ccffcc"
| 157 || September 22 || @ Angels || 4–1 || Hill (16–10) || Dickson || — || 17,522 || 86–70
|- bgcolor="ffbbbb"
| 158 || September 23 || @ Athletics || 3–5 || Wasdin || Witt (15–12) || Taylor || 10,164 || 86–71
|- bgcolor="ccffcc"
| 159 || September 24 || @ Athletics || 7–3 || Cook (5–2) || Small || — || 9,694 || 87–71
|- bgcolor="ccffcc"
| 160 || September 26 || Angels || 6–5 || Burkett (5–2) || Abbott || Henneman (31) || 33,895 || 88–71
|- bgcolor="ffbbbb"
| 161 || September 27 || Angels || 3–4 (15) || Harris || Whiteside (0–1) || Gohr || 46,764 || 88–72
|- bgcolor="ccffcc"
| 162 || September 28 || Angels || 4–3 || Oliver (14–6) || Finley || Heredia (1) || 45,651 || 89–72
|- bgcolor="ccffcc"
| 163 || September 29 || Angels || 4–3 || Witt (16–12) || Springer || — || 45,434 || 90–72
|-

|-
| Legend:       = Win       = Loss       = TieBold = Rangers team member

Detailed records

Notable transactions
 April 13, 1996: Jack Voigt was signed as a free agent by the Rangers.
 June 4, 1996: Travis Hafner was drafted by the Rangers in the 31st round of the 1996 Major League Baseball draft. Player signed June 2, 1997.
 July 31, 1996: Mark Brandenburg and Kerry Lacy were traded by the Rangers to the Boston Red Sox for Mike Stanton and a player to be named later. The Red Sox completed the deal by sending Dwayne Hosey to the Rangers on November 4.

Roster

Player stats

Batting

Starters by position
Note: Pos = Position; G = Games played; AB = At bats; H = Hits; Avg. = Batting average; HR = Home runs; RBI = Runs batted in

Other batters
Note: G = Games played; AB = At bats; H = Hits; Avg. = Batting average; HR = Home runs; RBI = Runs batted in

Pitching

Starting pitchers
Note: G = Games pitched; IP = Innings pitched; W = Wins; L = Losses; ERA = Earned run average; SO = Strikeouts

Other pitchers
Note: G = Games pitched; IP = Innings pitched; W = Wins; L = Losses; ERA = Earned run average; SO = Strikeouts

Relief pitchers
Note: G = Games pitched; W = Wins; L = Losses; SV = Saves; ERA = Earned run average; SO = Strikeouts

ALDS

Game 1, October 1
Yankee Stadium, The Bronx, New York

Game 2, October 2
Yankee Stadium, The Bronx, New York

Game 3, October 4
The Ballpark in Arlington, Arlington, Texas

Game 4, October 5
The Ballpark in Arlington, Arlington, Texas

Awards and honors
Kevin Elster, Comeback Player of The Year
Juan González, AL MVP
Juan González, Silver Slugger Award
Johnny Oates, AL Managers of the Year (was co-manager with Joe Torre)
Iván Rodríguez, C, Gold Glove
Iván Rodríguez, Silver Slugger Award
All-Star Game

Notes

Farm system

References
1996 Texas Rangers at Baseball Reference
1996 Texas Rangers at Baseball Almanac

Texas Rangers seasons
American League West champion seasons
Texas Rangers season
Range